Kroekrit Thaweekarn is a Thai professional footballer who plays as a left winger for Nakhon Si United on loan from Chonburi.

International career
Kroekrit represented Thailand at three consecutive SEA Games in 2009, 2011 and 2013, as well as the 2014 Asian Games.

He made his debut for the senior team in a 5–1 friendly win against China PR.

On 9 November 2014, Kroekrit scored his first senior international goal in a friendly match against the Philippines. He won the 2014 AFF Championship with Thailand and scored three goals at the tournament, two against the Philippines in the semi-finals and one against Malaysia in the first leg of the final.

International goals

Under-23

Senior

Honours

International
Thailand U-23
 SEA Games  Gold Medal (1): 2013

Thailand
 AFF Championship (2): 2014, 2016
 King's Cup (1): 2016

References

External links

1990 births
Living people
Kroekrit Thaweekarn
Kroekrit Thaweekarn
Association football midfielders
Association football wingers
Kroekrit Thaweekarn
Kroekrit Thaweekarn
Kroekrit Thaweekarn
Kroekrit Thaweekarn
Kroekrit Thaweekarn
Kroekrit Thaweekarn
Kroekrit Thaweekarn
Kroekrit Thaweekarn
Footballers at the 2014 Asian Games
Kroekrit Thaweekarn
Southeast Asian Games medalists in football
Competitors at the 2013 Southeast Asian Games
Kroekrit Thaweekarn
Nakhon Si United F.C. players